Tauna is an islet of the Gambier Islands of French Polynesia.

In and around Polynesia, islets are widely known by the term Motu, from the term for the coral-rubble islets common to the region.

During a recent filming of the television show GT Hunters shot on Tauna in April 2014, the locals of the village Rikitea have come to unofficially call this small island, Motu Topher, after the cinematographer who fell madly in love with the island.

See also

 Desert island
 List of islands

References

Islands of the Gambier Islands
Uninhabited islands of French Polynesia